Mount Sodom (Har Sedom) is a hill along the southwestern part of the Dead Sea in Israel; it is part of the Judaean Desert Nature Reserve. It takes its name from the legendary city of Sodom, whose destruction is the subject of a narrative in the Bible.

History
Mount Sodom began its rise hundreds of thousands of years ago and continues to grow taller at a rate of  a year.

Movements of the Great Rift Valley system, along with the pressure generated by the slow accumulation of earth and rock, pressed down on the layers of salt, creating Mount Sodom.

Because of weathering, some portions have separated. One of these pillars is known as "Lot's wife", in reference to the Biblical account of the destruction of Sodom and Gomorrah.

See also
 Judean Desert
 Nature reserves of Israel
 Tourism in Israel

References

Hebrew Bible mountains
Hills of Israel
Dead Sea
Sodom and Gomorrah
Judaean Desert